The Flint Flashes was a weekly paper published by the Socialist Party in Flint, Michigan during the early 20th Century, possibly started around 1907.  G. W. Starkweather was its manager and G. N. Lawrence its editor. In 1911, the Flint Flashes had a circulation of over 3,000 copies.

References

Weekly newspapers published in the United States
Newspapers published in Michigan